Sakhil Alakhverdovi (born 9 January 1999) is a Georgian boxer. He competed in the men's flyweight division at the 2020 Summer Olympics. He then contested the men's minimumweight division at the 2021 World Championships, where he won the bronze medal.

References

External links
 

1999 births
Living people
Male boxers from Georgia (country)
Olympic boxers of Georgia (country)
Boxers at the 2020 Summer Olympics
AIBA World Boxing Championships medalists
Flyweight boxers
Boxers at the 2019 European Games
European Games medalists in boxing
European Games silver medalists for Georgia (country)
21st-century people from Georgia (country)